Kharmanyeri (also Romanized as Kharmanyerī) is a village in Qaleh Darrehsi Rural District, in the Central District of Maku County, West Azerbaijan Province, Iran. At the 2006 census, the population was 518 persons in an estimated number of 99 families.

References 

Populated places in Maku County